The Old Masonic Hall in Carrollton, Mississippi, also known as Carrollton Lodge No. 36, is a historic building built in 1899 that was designated a Mississippi Landmark in 2002.

The Carrollton Masonic Lodge #36 was chartered in 1838.  The building was built in 1899.

References

Masonic buildings in Mississippi
Buildings and structures in Carroll County, Mississippi
Mississippi Landmarks
Masonic buildings completed in 1899
Clubhouses in Mississippi